Alfred Willis Holland (born August 16, 1952) is a former professional baseball relief pitcher, who played Major League Baseball (MLB) for the Pittsburgh Pirates, San Francisco Giants, Philadelphia Phillies, California Angels, and New York Yankees, from  to .

He was traded along with Ed Whitson and Fred Breining from the Pirates to the Giants for Bill Madlock, Lenny Randle and Dave Roberts on June 28, . He was acquired along with Joe Morgan by the Phillies from the Giants for Mike Krukow, Mark Davis and minor-league outfielder C.L. Penigar on December 14, 1982.

Holland finished seventh in the National League Rookie of the Year voting for 1980 but his best season was with the Philadelphia Phillies in  when he won the Rolaids Relief Man of the Year Award and TSN Fireman of the Year Award while finishing in the top ten in voting for both the Cy Young Award and National League MVP. He then saved Game 1 of the 1983 National League Championship Series, and struck out three batters in two innings to finish Game 4, clinching the pennant for the Phillies. He also saved Game 1 of the 1983 World Series. In Game 3 of the World Series, Holland was pitching in the seventh inning when an error allowed the go-ahead run to score.  Although Holland struck out four batters in the eighth and ninth innings, he and the Phillies lost in the last postseason game of his career. They then lost Games 4 and 5 as well to give the Baltimore Orioles the championship.

In , Holland was selected to his only All-Star Game but did not play. He was involved in a pair of trades during the  campaign. The first one on April 20 had him returning to the Pirates along with minor-league left-handed pitcher Frankie Griffin from the Phillies for Kent Tekulve. Then he was dealt along with John Candelaria and George Hendrick from the Pirates to the Angels for Pat Clements and Mike Brown on August 2 in a transaction that was completed two weeks later on August 16 when Bob Kipper was sent to Pittsburgh. He then hit a low point by being called to testify at the Pittsburgh drug trials. After admitting to cocaine abuse, he was suspended for sixty days of the 1986 season.

Holland's and ten other players' suspensions were reduced to anti-drug donations and community service, but Holland's career was nearly at an end. He was signed as a free agent by the New York Yankees, released by the Yankees, re-signed by the Yankees and then re-released by the Yankees — all in 1986. The Yankees signed him for the third time in 1987 but, after three games, his earned run average (ERA) was at 14.21. Holland was released by the Yankees a third time after the season and his major league career was over.

In 1989, the age 35-and-older Senior Professional Baseball Association began operation in Florida and Holland was a member of both the St. Petersburg Pelicans and St. Lucie Legends. The league folded in December 1990. Since then, Holland has spent time as a minor league pitching coach, as recently as 2006 for the Rookie-level Appalachian League's Johnson City Cardinals.

See also
List of sportspeople sanctioned for doping offences

References

External links 

 Al Holland at SABR (Baseball BioProject)

1952 births
Living people
Major League Baseball pitchers
Baseball players from Virginia
National League All-Stars
African-American baseball players
Pittsburgh Pirates players
San Francisco Giants players
Philadelphia Phillies players
California Angels players
New York Yankees players
Águilas Cibaeñas players
American expatriate baseball players in the Dominican Republic
Gulf Coast Pirates players
Niagara Falls Pirates players
Salem Pirates players
Shreveport Captains players
Columbus Clippers players
Phoenix Giants players
Portland Beavers players
Major League Baseball players suspended for drug offenses
Sportspeople from Roanoke, Virginia
St. Petersburg Pelicans players
St. Lucie Legends players
North Carolina A&T State University alumni
National College Baseball Hall of Fame inductees
21st-century African-American people
20th-century African-American sportspeople